Yuntai may refer to:

Places
Cloud Platform at Juyongguan (Juyongguan Yuntai), a Buddhist structure in Beijing
Yuntai Mountain
Yuntai Mountain (Henan), a mountain near Jiaozuo, Henan
Yuntai Mountain (Jiangsu), a mountain near Lianyungang, Jiangsu
Yuntai Road Station, a station on Line 7 of the Shanghai Metro

Other
Yuntai 28 generals, 28 generals of the Later Han whose portraits were hung at the South Palace tower in Luoyang